The Embassy of the Turkish Republic of Northern Cyprus in Ankara (Turkish: Kuzey Kıbrıs Türk Cumhuriyeti'nin Ankara Büyükelçiliği)
is the TRNC's only official embassy abroad as Turkey is the only nation thus far to recognize the TRNC as an independent state. TRNC has representative offices in other countries with semi-diplomatic status. 

This embassy was established in late 1983 shortly after Turkey signed a treaty with the TRNC recognizing the November 15 1983 Declaration of Independence of the Turkish Republic of Northern Cyprus.  The embassy itself is located in the Ankara suburb of Gaziosmanpaşa (not to be confused by the Istanbul suburb of the same name).

The internationally recognized government of the Republic of Cyprus (de facto the Greek Cypriot south of the island) has no diplomatic relations with Turkey, as the government of Turkey does not recognize the legitimacy of the Republic of Cyprus.

 was appointed as the TRNC's ambassador to Turkey in November 2014.

See also 
 Embassy of Turkey, North Nicosia
 Foreign Relations of the Turkish Republic of Northern Cyprus
 Cyprus dispute
List of ambassadors of Northern Cyprus to Turkey

Ankara
Northern Cyprus–Turkey relations
Northern Cyprus
Cyprus–Turkey relations